Rice & Curry is the first studio album by Swedish bubblegum dance artist Jonny Jakobsen under his pseudonym Dr. Bombay, released in 1998.

The album was the subject of mild controversy upon its release, prompted by a negative reaction to its faux-ethnic themes by the Indian government but no legal action was ever pursued.

Two of its tracks have been featured in the Beatmania IIDX series of video games and one is featured in the 2000 edition of Samba de Amigo.

Track listing
 Intro – 0:38
 Dr Boom-Bombay – 3:22
 Calcutta (Taxi Taxi Taxi) – 3:19
 Rice & Curry – 3:13
 Safari – 3:23
 S.O.S (The Tiger Took My Family) – 3:26
 Holabaloo – 3:04
 Shaky Snake – 3:03
 Girlie Girlie – 3:10
 My Sitar – 3:04
 Indy Dancing – 3:18
 Outro – 2:11

Music videos
Four music videos were produced for songs on the album. All of the music videos would later be released as bonus content on Jakobsen's first compilation album, The Hits. Videos were produced for the following songs:
 Calcutta (Taxi Taxi Taxi)
 Rice & Curry
 S.O.S (The Tiger Took My Family)
 Girlie Girlie

Chart position
Rice & Curry became Jakobsen's first major career success, topping the Swedish charts at number 1.

References

External links
Dr. Bombay at Bubblegum Dancer
The album at 7digital

1998 albums
Jonny Jakobsen albums
Warner Records albums